Miss Continental is an annual drag queen pageantry system founded in 1980 by Jim Flint. It takes place at the Baton Show Lounge in Chicago, Illinois, and is usually held over Labor Day weekend. In 1991, the Miss Continental Pageantry System created Miss Continental Plus for plus-size competitors weighing 225 pounds or more. Miss Continental Elite was created in 2004 for entertainers forty years of age and older. Miss Continental Plus and Miss Continental Elite had been held each year during Easter weekend in Chicago; now all are held during Labor Day weekend. Mr Continental was formed in 2003 for male entertainers.

Winners 
Legend:
† indicates that the contestant is deceased.

See also 
 Miss International Queen
 Miss Trans Star Internacional

References 

Richard Knight Jr. (January 17, 1990). Glamazons: Here she comes, with a few hundred pounds of sequins and a massive will to win. Chicago Tribune
Barbara Brotman (August 2, 1992). Gender gap: Lines blur as drag contestants give it all they've got-and more. Chicago Tribune

External links

LGBT beauty pageants
Transgender beauty pageants